"The Other Side" is a song by David Gray. It was released on 9 December 2002 as the first single from his sixth studio album A New Day at Midnight. The song deals with the theme of death (as Gray's father died in 2001.), in the context of a heartbreaking failed relationship and the author's reflections on his own and his ex-partner's emotional and spiritual failings. The B-side "Lorelei" also appeared on the Japanese pressing of the album as a bonus track. A rare official remix by Novation was released as a promo-only vinyl, but has never been released on any other format. The single peaked on the UK Singles Chart at #35.

Track listings
UK CD single
 "The Other Side" – 4:31
 "Decipher" – 2:32
 "Lorelei" – 3:23

US 7" promo-only vinyl
 "The Other Side"
 "Babylon" (Live at Joe's Pub)

UK 12" promo-only vinyl
 "The Other Side" (Novation Remix)

References

David Gray (musician) songs
2002 singles
Songs written by David Gray (musician)
2002 songs
East West Records singles